King Kong vs. Tarzan is a 2016 novel by Will Murray, featuring the characters created by Edgar Rice Burroughs in a crossover with the characters created by Merian C. Cooper for the novelization of King Kong.  It is authorized by Burroughs' estate.

Plot
After capturing King Kong on Skull Island, Carl Denham ferries him across the Indian Ocean and around the continent of Africa, planning to eventually take him to New York City.  But trouble befalls the tramp steamer Wanderer, and she is forced to make landfall in Africa, home of Tarzan; whom Denham had met once some years before. Kong escapes and roams the jungles, unintentionally causing havoc amongst its population as he slaughters numerous African wildlife and desecrates the elephant graveyard.  Hearing reports of a giant gorilla on the loose, Tarzan investigates. A climactic showdown in a thunderstorm is joined between the Lord of the Jungle atop a herd of elephants and the King of Skull island, with Carl Denham trying to recapture Kong and scheming to do the same thing to Tarzan.

References

2016 American novels
2016 fantasy novels
American adventure novels
American fantasy novels
Crossover novels
Novels based on films